Macropholidus huancabambae is a species of lizard in the family Gymnophthalmidae. It is endemic to Peru.

References

Macropholidus
Reptiles of Peru
Endemic fauna of Peru
Reptiles described in 1996
Taxa named by Tod W. Reeder